Martin Louis Paich (January 23, 1925 – August 12, 1995) was an American pianist, composer, arranger, record producer, music director, and conductor. As a musician and arranger he worked with jazz musicians Peggy Lee, Ella Fitzgerald, Stan Kenton, Art Pepper, Buddy Rich, Ray Brown, Shorty Rogers, Pete Rugolo, Ray Charles and Mel Tormé. His long association with Tormé included one of the singer's earliest albums, Mel Tormé and the Marty Paich Dek-Tette. Over the next three decades he worked with pop singers such as Andy Williams and Jack Jones and for film and television. He is the father of David Paich, a founding member of the rock band Toto.

Career
A native of Oakland, California, Paich learned accordion and piano at an early age. In the 1930s, when he was ten years old, he was leading bands and performing at weddings. At sixteen, he wrote arrangements with Pete Rugolo. He served with the U.S. Air Corps in World War II. He attended the University of Southern California and received a master's degree in composition from the Los Angeles Conservatory of Music. Among his teachers were Julia Bal de Zuniga, Mario Castelnuovo-Tedesco, and Arnold Schoenberg.

In the 1950s, in addition to working as music director for Peggy Lee, he wrote arrangements for Chet Baker, Ray Brown, Stan Kenton, Shelly Manne, Dave Pell, Buddy Rich, Shorty Rogers, and for the movie Lady and the Tramp. He began recording with Mel Tormé in 1955 on the album It's a Blue World when Tormé was moving from pop singer to jazz singer. During the next year, his ten piece band accompanied Tormé on the album Mel Tormé and the Marty Paich Dek-Tette, which contained a version of the 1930s song "Lulu's Back in Town". He wrote arrangements for Art Pepper for the album Art Pepper + Eleven – Modern Jazz Classics.

In the 1960s, he spent less time as a musician and more as an arranger for pop singers such as Sammy Davis Jr., Dean Martin, Barbra Streisand, Andy Williams, Dinah Shore, and Jack Jones. He also scored films, such as Hey There, It's Yogi Bear! (1964), The Man Called Flintstone (1966), The Swinger (1966) and Changes (1969). In the 1970s, he worked as a composer and arranger in film and television, winning an Emmy award for the television drama Ironside. He led the studio orchestras for television variety programs such as The Glen Campbell Goodtime Hour and The Smothers Brothers Comedy Hour and replaced Nelson Riddle in The Sonny & Cher Comedy Hour.

He orchestrated and conducted scores for the films The Fugitive, Pretty Woman, and Prince of Tides.

Death
Paich died of colon cancer at the age of 70 on August 12, 1995 in Santa Ynez, California.

Awards and honors
 Emmy, Best Song or Theme, Ironside, 1974

Discography

As leader
 Hot Piano (Tampa, 1956)
 Marty Paich Quartet (Tampa, 1956)
 Marty Paich Trio (Mode, 1957)
 The Broadway Bit (Warner Bros., 1959)
 I Get a Boot Out of You (Warner Bros., 1959)
 Present Robert Merrill's Music from the Broadway Production Take Me Along (RCA Victor, 1960)
 Lush, Latin & Cool (RCA Victor, 1961)
 The Rock Jazz Incident (Reprise, 1966)
 What's New (Discovery, 1982)
 Paich-Ence (Fresh Sound, 2006)

As sideman
With Dave Pell
 A Pell of a Time (RCA Victor, 1957)
 Swingin' in the Ol' Corral (RCA Victor, 1957)
 The Big Small Bands (Capitol, 1960)
 Way Better (Capitol, 1961)

With Johnny Rivers
 Realization (Imperial, 1968)
 Slim Slo Slider (Imperial, 1970)
 Outside Help (Soul City/Big Tree, 1977)

With Mel Tormé
 It's a Blue World (Bethlehem, 1955)
 Mel Torme Sings Fred Astaire (Bethlehem, 1956)
 Mel Torme with the Marty Paich Dek-Tette (Bethlehem, 1956)
 Songs for Any Taste (Bethlehem, 1959)
 Tormé (Verve, 1959)
 Back in Town (Verve, 1960)
 Swings Shubert Alley (Verve, 1960)
 Songs of Love (Hurrah, 1962)
 Reunion (Concord Jazz, 1988)
 In Concert Tokyo (Concord 1989)
 I Let a Song Go Out of My Heart (Giants of Jazz, 1999)
 The Art Pepper Marty Paich Sessions (Lone Hill, 2007)

With others
 Laurie Allyn, Paradise (Mode, 2004)
 Patti Austin, Patti Austin (Qwest, 1984)
 Jesse Belvin, Mr. Easy (RCA 1960)
 Stephen Bishop, Bish (ABC 1978)
 Joe Bushkin, Night Sounds San Francisco (Decca, 1966)
 Ray Charles, Modern Sounds in Country and Western Music (ABC-Paramount, 1962)
 Hank Crawford, Soul of the Ballad (Atlantic, 1963)
 Neil Diamond, Tap Root Manuscript (UNI, 1970)
 Bob Enevoldsen, Bob Enevoldsen Quintet (Tampa, 1956)
 Bob Enevoldsen, Smorgasbord (Liberty, 1956)
 Don Fagerquist, Music to Fill a Void Eight by Eight (Mode, 1957)
 Jerry Fielding, Swingin' in Hi-Fi (Decca, 1956)
 Herbie Fields, Blow Hot Blow Cool (Decca, 1955)
 Ella Fitzgerald, Ella Swings Lightly (Verve, 1958)
 Ella Fitzgerald, Whisper Not (Verve, 1966)
 Russell Garcia, Four Horns and a Lush Life (Bethlehem, 1956)
 Russell Garcia, Russel Garcia and His Four Trombone Band (Fresh Sound, 2005)
 Herb Geller, Milt Bernhart, Howard Roberts, Curtis Counce, Jazz Studio 2 from Hollywood (Decca, 1954)
 Jimmy Giuffre, Bob Cooper, Harry Klee, Bob Enevoldsen, Tenors West (GNP, 1956)
 Herbie Harper, Herbie Harper Sextet! (Mode, 1957)
 The Hi-Lo's, And All That Jazz (Columbia, 1958)
 Al Hirt, Trumpet and Strings (RCA Victor, 1964)
 Lena Horne, Lena Sings Your Requests (CRC, 1963)
 Mahalia Jackson, Christmas with Mahalia (Columbia)
 Elton John, The Fox (Geffen, 1981)
 Jack Jones, I've Got a Lot of Livin' to Do! (Kapp, 1962)
 Anita Kerr, Mellow Moods of Love (RCA 1965)
 Ronnie Lang, Modern Jazz (Tops, 1957)
 Mel Lewis, Mel Lewis Sextet (Mode, 1957)
 Abbey Lincoln, Affair...A Story of a Girl in Love (Liberty, 1957)
 Cheryl Lynn, Cheryl Lynn (Columbia, 1978)
 Shelly Manne, The West Coast Sound (Contemporary, 1956)
 Randy Meisner, Randy Meisner (Asylum, 1978)
 Ann-Margret, Songs from the Swinger and Other Swingin' Songs (RCA Victor, 1967)
 Audrey Morris, The Voice of Audrey Morris (Bethlehem, 1956)
 Anita O'Day, Anita O'Day Sings the Winners (Verve, 1958)
 Art Pepper, Chile Pepper (Charlie Parker)
 Lucy Ann Polk, Lucky Lucy Ann (Mode, 1957)
 Johnny Richards, Something Else by Johnny Richards (Bethlehem, 1956)
 Howard Roberts, Mr. Roberts Plays Guitar (Verve, 1957)
 Shorty Rogers, Shorty Rogers Courts the Count (RCA Victor, 1954)
 Shorty Rogers, The Big Shorty Rogers Express (RCA Victor, 1956)
 Linda Ronstadt Cry Like a Rainstorm, Howl Like the Wind (Elektra, 1989)
 Jack Sheldon, A Jazz Profile of Ray Charles (Reprise, 1961)
 Eddie Shu, Jazz Practitioners (Bethlehem, 1957)
 Sarah Vaughan, Songs of the Beatles (Atlantic, 1981)
 Sarah Vaughan, Gershwin Live! (Columbia, 1982)
 Leon Ware, Leon Ware (Elektra, 1982)
 Fran Warren, Hey There! Here's Fran Warren (Tops, 1957)
 Fran Warren, Come Rain or Come Shine (Venise, 1959)
 Stu Williamson, Jack Sheldon, A Jazz Band Ball: First Set (Mode, 1957)

See also
 List of jazz arrangers

References

External links
 
 Thomas Cunniffe, "Mel Tormé and the Marty Paich Dek-tette",   Jazz.com
 

1925 births
1995 deaths
20th-century American businesspeople
20th-century American composers
20th-century American male musicians
20th-century American pianists
United States Army personnel of World War II
American bandleaders
American jazz composers
American jazz pianists
American male pianists
American music arrangers
Burials at Valley Oaks Memorial Park
Candid Records artists
Chapman University alumni
Cool jazz pianists
Deaths from cancer in California
Deaths from colorectal cancer
Jazz arrangers
Jazz musicians from California
American male jazz composers
Musicians from Oakland, California
Record producers from California
United States Army Air Forces soldiers
20th-century jazz composers